Dzierżążno  is a village in the administrative district of Gmina Morzeszczyn, within Tczew County, Pomeranian Voivodeship, in northern Poland. It is located within the ethnocultural region of Kociewie in the historic region of Pomerania.

The village has a population of 295.

Dzierżążno was a private church village of the Diocese of Włocławek, administratively located in the Tczew County in the Pomeranian Voivodeship of the Polish Crown.

References

Villages in Tczew County